"Tides" is a song by English singer-songwriter Ed Sheeran. It is the first track on his fifth studio album, = (2021). It was written and produced by Sheeran, Johnny McDaid and Foy Vance with Joe Rubel as its additional producer. After the album's release, it charted at number 43, 63, 169, 83 and 75 on Australia, Canada, France, South Africa and Sweden, respectively as well as charting at number 68 on the Global 200.

Background
Sheeran has said that "Tides" is about spending time with his family and forgetting about the chaos of life when he is with his loved ones: “The verses are about what went on in my career and personal life. The verses are pure chaos, while the chorus is completely A cappella - the lyrics are ‘time stops to still when you are in my arms and it will always.' It’s like once the door closes and you’re alone with your family the chaos is shut out. It’s an interesting song because it’s so loud and so quiet and so loud and so quiet, I really like it.”

Promotion and release
On 19 August 2021, Sheeran announced his fourth studio album, =, in which the song is listed on the tracklist. On 29 October 2021, "Tides" was released alongside other album tracks that appeared on the album =.

Lyric video
A lyric video for the song was uploaded on Sheeran's YouTube account on 29 October 2021 along with the other lyric videos of the songs that appeared on the tracklisting of =.

Credits and personnel
 Ed Sheeran – vocals, backing vocals, bass, drums, guitar, production, songwriting, writing
 Foy Vance – piano, backing vocals, guitar, production, songwriting, writing
 Joe Rubel – guitar, programming, bass, piano, engineering, production
 Johnny McDaid – piano, production, songwriting, writing
 Matt Glasbey – programming
 Stuart Hawkes – mastering
 Mark "Spike" Stent – mixing
 Matt Glasbey – engineering
 Robert Sellens – engineering
 Kieran Beardmore – mixing assistance
 Charlie Holmes – mixing assistance
 Camden Clarke – engineering assistance

Charts

References

2021 singles
Ed Sheeran songs
Songs written by Ed Sheeran
2021 songs
Songs written by Johnny McDaid
Songs written by Foy Vance